Dillwynia hispida , commonly known as red parrot-pea, is a species of flowering plant in the family Fabaceae and is endemic to south-eastern Australia. It is an erect shrub with more or less glabrous stems, linear to thread-like leaves and orange and red, partly crimson flowers.

Description

Taxonomy
Dillwynia hispida was first formally described in 1838 by John Lindley in Thomas Mitchell's journal, Three Expeditions into the interior of Eastern Australia. The specific epithet (hispida) means "with rough, bristly hairs".

Distribution and habitat
This dillwynia mainly grows in heath, woodland, forest and mallee scrubland in western Victoria, southern inland New South, and south-eastern South Australia.

References 

hispida
Fabales of Australia
Flora of New South Wales
Flora of South Australia
Flora of Victoria (Australia)
Taxa named by John Lindley
Plants described in 1838